Ewing Township is a township in Mercer County, in the U.S. state of New Jersey. The township falls within the New York metropolitan area as defined by the U.S. Census Bureau. It borders the Philadelphia metropolitan area and is part of the Federal Communications Commission's Philadelphia Designated Market Area. As of the 2020 United States census, the township's population was 37,264, an increase of 1,474 (+4.1%) from the 2010 census count of 35,790, which in turn reflected an increase of 83 (+0.2%) from the 35,707 counted in the 2000 census.

History

The earliest inhabitants of present-day Ewing Township in the historic era were Lenni Lenape Native Americans, who lived along the banks of the Delaware River. Their pre-colonial subsistence activities in the area included hunting, fishing, pottery-making, and simple farming. European settlers, mostly from the British Isles, began to colonize the area in 1699. One of the earliest European settlers was William Green, and his 1717 farmhouse still stands on the campus of The College of New Jersey.

The area that is now Ewing Township was part of Hopewell Township in what was a very large Burlington County at the beginning of the 18th century. In 1714 Hopewell was removed from Burlington County and added to Hunterdon County. By 1719, the area which was to become Ewing Township had been removed from Hopewell Township and added to the newly created Trenton Township. Portions of Trenton Township were incorporated as Ewing Township by an act of the New Jersey Legislature on February 22, 1834, posthumously honoring Charles Ewing for his work as Chief Justice of the New Jersey Supreme Court. The township became part of the newly created Mercer County on February 22, 1838. After incorporation, Ewing Township received additional territory taken from Lawrence Township and the city of Trenton in 1858. In 1894 the city of Trenton took back some of that territory, annexing more in 1900.

When Ewing Township was incorporated in the 19th century, it was primarily farmland with a handful of scattered hamlets, including Carleton (now known as Ewing), Cross Keys (now known as Ewingville), Birmingham (now known as West Trenton) and Greensburg (now known as Wilburtha). Since the beginning of the 20th century, the township has developed as a suburb of Trenton. The sections near the city border are distinctly urban, but most of the township is suburban residential development. The main commercial district extends along North Olden Avenue Extension (County Route 622), originally constructed to connect north Trenton residences with the now-closed General Motors Inland Fisher Guide Plant. Ewing Township today is the location of The College of New Jersey, the Community Blood Council of New Jersey, New Jersey State Police headquarters, the Jones Farm State Correction Institute, the Trenton Psychiatric Hospital, the New Jersey Department of Transportation headquarters, the Maria H. Katzenbach School for the Deaf and Trenton-Mercer Airport.

From 1953 until 1997, Ewing was the home of Naval Air Warfare Center Trenton, encompassing  on Parkway Avenue. It was used by the United States Navy as a jet engine test facility until its closure based on the recommendations of the 1993 Base Closure and Realignment Commission. Nearly 700 civilian positions were eliminated, most of which were relocated to other facilities in Maryland and Tennessee. The base's Marine operations were transferred to Fort Dix, which has since become Joint Base McGuire-Dix-Lakehurst. A charity to end homelessness acquired the base at no cost in October 2013 in a process involving the United States Department of Defense, the United States Department of Housing and Urban Development, Mercer County and Ewing Township.

The first location of an industrial robot used to replace human workers was at Ewing's Inland Fisher Guide Plant in 1961, a facility that operated in the township for 1938 to 1998, after which the plant was demolished and targeted for redevelopment.

Geography

According to the U.S. Census Bureau, the township had a total area of 15.56 square miles (40.29 km2), including 15.21 square miles (39.38 km2) of land and 0.35 square miles (0.90 km2) of water (2.24%).

The highest elevation in Ewing Township is  AMSL just east of Interstate 95 and just west of Trenton-Mercer Airport, while the lowest point is just below  AMSL along the Delaware River near the border with Trenton.

The largest body of water completely within the township is Lake Sylva, a man-made lake that was created in the 1920s when an earthen dam was constructed across the Shabakunk Creek. The  lake is located on the campus of The College of New Jersey. Watercourses in Ewing include the Delaware River along its western boundary and the Shabakunk Creek in the eastern and central portions of the township.

The township has a number of distinct neighborhoods, including Agasote, Altura, Arbor Walk, Braeburn Heights, Briarcrest, Briarwood, Cambridge Hall, Churchill Green, Delaware Rise, Ewing, Ewing Park, Ewingville, Fernwood, Ferry Road Manor, Fleetwood Village, Glendale, Green Curve Heights, Hampton Hills, Heath Manor, Hickory Hill Estates, Hillwood Lakes, Hillwood Manor, Mountainview, Parkway Village, Prospect Heights, Prospect Park, Scudders Falls, Shabakunk Hills, Sherbrooke Manor, Somerset, Spring Meadows, Spring Valley, Village on the Green, Weber Park, West Trenton, Whitewood Estates, Wilburtha and Wynnewood Manor. Some of these existed before suburbanization, while others came into existence with the suburban development of the township in the 20th century.

The township borders the municipalities of Hopewell Township, Lawrence Township, Trenton in Mercer County; and Lower Makefield Township, Upper Makefield Township and Yardley in Bucks County across the Delaware River in Pennsylvania.

According to the A. W. Kuchler U.S. potential natural vegetation types, Ewing Township, New Jersey would have an Appalachian Oak (104) vegetation type with an Eastern Hardwood Forest (25) vegetation form.

Climate
According to the Köppen climate classification system, Ewing Township, New Jersey has a hot-summer, wet all year, humid continental climate (Dfa). Dfa climates are characterized by at least one month having an average mean temperature ≤ , at least four months with an average mean temperature ≥ , at least one month with an average mean temperature ≥ , and no significant precipitation difference between seasons. During the summer months, episodes of extreme heat and humidity can occur with heat index values ≥ . On average, the wettest month of the year is July which corresponds with the annual peak in thunderstorm activity. During the winter months, episodes of extreme cold and wind can occur with wind chill values < .

Demographics

2010 census

The Census Bureau's 2006–2010 American Community Survey showed that (in 2010 inflation-adjusted dollars) median household income was $69,716 (with a margin of error of +/− $2,668) and the median family income was $86,875 (+/− $4,312). Males had a median income of $56,308 (+/− $6,003) versus $52,313 (+/− $1,887) for females. The per capita income for the borough was $30,489 (+/− $1,527). About 4.7% of families and 10.0% of the population were below the poverty line, including 7.3% of those under age 18 and 6.4% of those age 65 or over.

2000 census
As of the 2000 United States census there were 35,707 people, 12,551 households, and 8,208 families residing in the township. The population density was 2,328.6 people per square mile (899.3/km2). There were 12,924 housing units at an average density of 842.8 per square mile (325.5/km2). The racial makeup of the township was 69.02% White, 24.82% African American, 0.15% Native American, 2.27% Asian, 0.06% Pacific Islander, 1.83% from other races, and 1.84% from two or more races. Hispanic or Latino of any race were 4.44% of the population.

There were 12,551 households, out of which 25.3% had children under the age of 18 living with them, 49.7% were married couples living together, 12.2% had a female householder with no husband present, and 34.6% were non-families. 27.7% of all households were made up of individuals, and 12.1% had someone living alone who was 65 years of age or older. The average household size was 2.45 and the average family size was 3.00.

In the township the population was spread out, with 18.0% under the age of 18, 17.3% from 18 to 24, 26.8% from 25 to 44, 22.1% from 45 to 64, and 15.8% who were 65 years of age or older. The median age was 37 years. For every 100 females, there were 93.0 males. For every 100 females age 18 and over, there were 90.0 males.

The median income for a household in the township was $57,274, and the median income for a family was $67,618. Males had a median income of $44,531 versus $35,844 for females. The per capita income for the township was $24,268. About 3.3% of families and 6.4% of the population were below the poverty line, including 5.4% of those under age 18 and 7.1% of those age 65 or over.

Economy
In May 2013, Church & Dwight relocated its corporate headquarters from Princeton to Ewing. In mid–2013, Celator Pharmaceuticals established an office presence in Ewing.

Government

Local government
Ewing Township is governed under the Faulkner Act, formally known as the Optional Municipal Charter Law, within the Mayor-Council plan 2 form of New Jersey municipal government, as implemented as of January 1, 1995, based on the recommendations of a Charter Study Commission. The township is one of 71 municipalities (of the 564) statewide governed under this form. The township's governing body is comprised of the Mayor and the five-member Township Council, all of whom are elected by the voters at-large to four-year terms of office on a staggered basis. with either three seats up for election or two seats and the mayoral seat up together in even-numbered years as part of the November general election.

, the Mayor of Ewing Township is Democrat Bert H. Steinmann, whose term of office ends December 31, 2026. Members of the Ewing Township Council are Council President Kathy Culliton Wollert (D, 2026), Vice President Kevin Baxter (D, 2024), Jennifer L. Keyes-Maloney (D, 2024) and David P. Schroth (D, 2024) and Sarah Steward (D, 2026).

Federal, state and county representation
Ewing Township is located in the 12th Congressional District and is part of New Jersey's 15th state legislative district.

 

The New Jersey Juvenile Justice Commission has its headquarters in the township.

Politics
As of March 2011, there were a total of 21,714 registered voters in Ewing Township, of which 9,358 (43.1%) were registered as Democrats, 3,256 (15.0%) were registered as Republicans and 9,087 (41.8%) were registered as Unaffiliated. There were 13 voters registered as Libertarians or Greens.

In the 2012 presidential election, Democrat Barack Obama received 73.0% of the vote (11,910 cast), ahead of Republican Mitt Romney with 25.8% (4,218 votes), and other candidates with 1.2% (190 votes), among the 17,947 ballots cast by the township's 23,230 registered voters (1,629 ballots were spoiled), for a turnout of 77.3%. In the 2008 presidential election, Democrat Barack Obama received 70.0% of the vote (11,911 cast), ahead of Republican John McCain with 28.1% (4,787 votes) and other candidates with 1.2% (200 votes), among the 17,021 ballots cast by the township's 22,913 registered voters, for a turnout of 74.3%. In the 2004 presidential election, Democrat John Kerry received 62.0% of the vote (10,091 ballots cast), outpolling Republican George W. Bush with 34.7% (5,653 votes) and other candidates with 0.6% (135 votes), among the 16,284 ballots cast by the township's 22,019 registered voters, for a turnout percentage of 74.0.

In the 2013 gubernatorial election, Democrat Barbara Buono received 53.7% of the vote (5,279 cast), ahead of Republican Chris Christie with 44.7% (4,395 votes), and other candidates with 1.7% (163 votes), among the 10,070 ballots cast by the township's 22,876 registered voters (233 ballots were spoiled), for a turnout of 44.0%. In the 2009 gubernatorial election, Democrat Jon Corzine received 59.4% of the vote (6,529 ballots cast), ahead of Republican Chris Christie with 34.1% (3,751 votes), Independent Chris Daggett with 4.7% (520 votes) and other candidates with 0.7% (81 votes), among the 10,989 ballots cast by the township's 22,263 registered voters, yielding a 49.4% turnout.

Education
Ewing Public Schools serves students in pre-kindergarten through twelfth grade. As of the 2020–21 school year, the district, comprised of five schools, had an enrollment of 3,444 students and 333.0 classroom teachers (on an FTE basis), for a student–teacher ratio of 10.3:1. Schools in the district (with 2020–21 enrollment data from the National Center for Education Statistics) are 
W. L. Antheil Elementary School with 623 students in grades PreK-5, Francis Lore Elementary School with 500 students in grades K–5, Parkway Elementary School with 358 students in grades K–5, Gilmore J. Fisher Middle School with 827 students in grades 6–8, and Ewing High School with 1,080 students in grades 9–12.

A 1946 court case challenged a policy of the Ewing Public Schools under which the district provided bus transportation to students living in the districts who attended private parochial schools. In Everson v. Board of Education, the Supreme Court of the United States ruled for the first time that state and local government were subject to the Establishment Clause of the First Amendment to the United States Constitution, but that it had not been violated in this instance.

The Ewing Public Education Foundation, established in 1995, is an independent, not-for-profit citizen's organization whose mission is to mobilize community support, concern, commitment and resources to help improve the quality of education in Ewing Township. EPEF provides grants to Ewing Township Schools for innovative educational programs through fund-raising activities, and corporate and institutional sponsorship. The Foundation also seeks to match corporate and organizational donors with teachers to fund additional projects of mutual interest. These programs enhance the educational experience without the use of additional taxpayer dollars.

Eighth grade students from all of Mercer County are eligible to apply to attend the high school programs offered by the Mercer County Technical Schools, a county-wide vocational school district that offers full-time career and technical education at its Health Sciences Academy, STEM Academy and Academy of Culinary Arts, with no tuition charged to students for attendance. The Thomas J. Rubino Academy (formerly Mercer County Alternative High School) is one of Mercer County's only alternative schools, offering an alternative educational program for students who have struggled in the traditional school environment, featuring smaller classes, mentoring and counseling.

The Marie H. Katzenbach School for the Deaf opened in Trenton in 1883 and was there until 1923, when it moved to West Trenton. It serves 175 hearing-impaired students on a campus covering  that was opened in West Trenton in 1926. The school was established in Ewing through the efforts of Marie Hilson Katzenbach and was renamed in her honor in 1965.

Incarnation-St. James Catholic School (formerly Incarnation School), constructed in 1955, was a Pre-K to 8th grade parish school administered by The Sisters, Servants of the Immaculate Heart of Mary and overseen by the Roman Catholic Diocese of Trenton. In 2006, the Incarnation School and parish combined with the St. James School and parish. The school was closed by the parish at the end of the 2014-15 school year.

The Villa Victoria Academy is a private Catholic school in Ewing Township, christened as a private academy in 1933, and operated by the Religious Teachers Filippini. This single-gender school offers an education to young women from sixth to twelfth grade.

The College of New Jersey (formerly Trenton State College) is located on a campus covering  within the township.

Transportation
Ewing Township is traversed by multiple main roadways, as well as by a passenger rail line and is the location of an airport.

Roads and highways

Several highways pass through the township. Interstate 295 crosses the northwestern section of the township. Originally part of Interstate 95, it was constructed as a four-lane facility in the 1960s, and widened to six lanes in the 1990s, with the exception of the Scudder Falls Bridge over the Delaware River. It connects south with Philadelphia, Pennsylvania and connects north to U.S. Route 1, where Interstate 295 curves south. From there, travelers use U.S. 1 or Interstate 195 and the New Jersey Turnpike to reach the next major destination northwards, New York City. The Ewing portion of Interstate 95 was redesignated as Interstate 295 in March 2018 ahead of a direct interchange between Interstate 95 in Pennsylvania and the Pennsylvania Turnpike being completed, re-routing Interstate 95 onto the New Jersey Turnpike at Exit 6 (in Mansfield Township).

U.S. Route 206 (Princeton Avenue) skirts the southeastern section of the township. Although part of U.S. 206, it is  maintained by the Mercer County Department of Transportation as part of County Route 583, which runs as a concurrency with U.S. 206, which connects south to Trenton, as well as north to Princeton and Somerville.

Route 29 (Daniel Bray Highway and River Road) extends north–south along the western edge of the township, along the Delaware River. NJ 29 connects southwards to Trenton, and northwards to Lambertville and Frenchtown. The entire section of Route 29 in Ewing is designated the Delaware River Scenic Byway, a National Scenic Byway. Route 175 serves as a frontage road along the divided portion of Route 29.

Route 31 (Pennington Road) extends north–south towards the eastern side of the township. It once also carried a trolley line, but it has long since been removed. It was once proposed to be bypassed by a freeway, but this plan has since been cancelled. Route 31 also connects south to Trenton, and connects north to Pennington, Flemington, and Clinton.

Public transportation

The West Trenton Station is at the terminus of SEPTA's West Trenton Line. This commuter rail facility mainly serves commuter traffic to and from Philadelphia.

Ewing Township is the site of the Trenton-Mercer Airport (TTN), which first opened in 1929 and is one of three commercial airports in the state. The airport has 100,000 takeoffs and landings annually, and is served by Frontier Airlines, which offers nonstop service to and from 10 different locations nationwide.

Ewing Township is also traversed by the Delaware and Raritan Canal near the Delaware River. Originally important to commerce and trade, the advent of railroads caused the canal's commercial demise. The strip of land along the canal is currently part of the Delaware and Raritan Canal State Park.

NJ Transit provides service between the township and Trenton on the 601,  607, 608, 609, and 624 routes.

Points of interest

 The William Greene Farmhouse was the home of Judge William Greene, who was born in the 1600s in England and died in 1722 in Hunterdon County, New Jersey. The William Green House is on the U.S. National Register of Historic Places and the New Jersey Register of Historic Places.
 Delaware and Raritan Canal – Runs along the eastern bank of the Delaware River in western Ewing Township.
 Washington Victory Trail – Documents the trail taken by George Washington's army during the American Revolutionary War on December 26, 1776. This led to a successful surprise attack on the Hessian troops occupying Trenton, New Jersey. Victory trail begins in nearby Washington Crossing State Park, enters Ewing Township at Jacobs Creek Road (where George Washington's and his horse almost fell into the creek) and continues along Bear Tavern Road. General Sullivan's route follows Grand Avenue and Sullivan Way to Trenton. General Greene's route follows Parkway Avenue to Trenton.
Ewing Presbyterian Church is an historic building dated 1867 and set within the American Revolutionary War-era Ewing Church Cemetery. It is the fourth church to be built in the cemetery grounds. The current church building has been under threat of demolition after several engineering studies found the roof trusses are buckling and beyond the point of cost effective repair. Numerous preservation groups say that the structural problems are much easier to resolve than the studies claim. Various organizations have tried to raise funds to secure the stability of the original church structure.
 Ewing Church Cemetery is one of the oldest cemeteries in the area, having served the Ewing community for 300 years. It is home to the burial places of hundreds of veterans from The Revolutionary War to the Vietnam War. The grounds span over 50 acres and also include a mausoleum.
 Our Lady of Good Counsel Church, located on W. Upper Ferry Road, is a Roman Catholic church built in the early 1960s to meet the growing needs of the rapidly expanding township. Its architecture is similar to Saint Paul's Church in Princeton. The Church is a major worship center for the Catholic community in what is called the West Trenton section of the township.
 Louis Kahn's Trenton Bath House was an early work of the influential mid-twentieth century architect, made for the Trenton Jewish Community Center (now the Ewing Senior & Community Center).
 The offices and studios of radio station WKXW, "New Jersey 101.5", are located in Ewing.

Notable people

People who were born in, residents of, or otherwise closely associated with Ewing Township include:
 Pierre Bernard, graphic designer and comedian for Late Night with Conan O'Brien on which he hosts the segment "Pierre Bernard's Recliner of Rage"
 Peggy Blackford (born 1942), American Ambassador to Guinea-Bissau from 1995 until relations were suspended in June 1998
 Al Clark (born 1948), former professional baseball umpire who worked in 3,392 major league games in his 26-year career
 Hollis Copeland (born 1955), former basketball player with the New York Knicks
 Steve Garrison (born 1986), Major League Baseball relief pitcher who played for the New York Yankees
 Janis Hirsch (born ), is a comedy writer best known for producing and writing for television series
 Wayne Krenchicki (1954–2018), former MLB third baseman
 William M. Lanning (1849–1912), Republican Party politician who represented New Jersey's 4th congressional district in the United States House of Representatives from 1903 to 1904
 Dick LaRossa (born 1946), politician who served two terms in the New Jersey Senate, from 1994 to 2000, where he represented the 15th Legislative District
 Davon Reed (born 1995), basketball player for the Sioux Falls SkyForce
 Glenn K. Rieth (born 1957), former Adjutant General of New Jersey (2002-2011)
 Henry Rowan (1923–2015), engineer and philanthropist, for whom Rowan University was renamed, after he made a $100 million donation to the school
 Albert C. Wagner (1911–1987), director of the New Jersey Department of Corrections from 1966 to 1973
 Bonnie Watson Coleman (born 1945), politician, who has served as the U.S. representative for New Jersey's 12th congressional district since 2015 She is the first black woman in Congress from New Jersey.

References

External links

 

 
1834 establishments in New Jersey
Faulkner Act (mayor–council)
New Jersey populated places on the Delaware River
Populated places established in 1834
Townships in Mercer County, New Jersey